The Samsung Galaxy A32 is a mid-range Android smartphone developed and manufactured by Samsung Electronics. It serves as the successor to the Galaxy A31. The phone is similar to its predecessor, but features an upgraded 64 MP main camera. The device also comes with a 5G variant with stripped-down camera and screen (48 MP main camera and PLS TFT display), but with a faster SoC.

The Galaxy A32 5G was the first to be released on 22 January 2021 while the Galaxy A32 was released subsequently on 17 February 2021.

Specifications

Design 
The Galaxy A32 uses tempered glass for protecting the display, plastic frame and plastic back. There are 4 color options for both devices, titled Awesome Black, Awesome White, Awesome Blue and Awesome Violet.

Physical dimensions and weight

4G variant 

 158.9 × 73.6 × 8.4 mm (6.26 × 2.90 × 0.33 in) (H × W × D)
 184 grams (~6.49 oz)

5G variant 

 164.2 × 76.1 × 9.1 mm (6.46 × 3.00 × 0.36 in) (H × W × D) 
 205 grams (~7.23 oz)

Hardware 
Galaxy A32 4G uses the MediaTek Helio G80 (12 nm) SoC with octa-core CPU (2x2.0 GHz Cortex-A75 + 6x1.8 GHz Cortex-A55) and Mali G52-MC2 GPU. It runs on Android 11 with One UI 3.1. It has 64GB or 128GB of internal memory (ROM) with 4GB - 8GB of RAM. It has removable external microSDXC memory card slot (dedicated slot, maximum 512 GB is supported). It has single or dual (dual stand-by) SIM slot (nano-SIM). It has 5000 mAh Li-Ion battery (non-removable) with 15W fast charging support. It supports GSM, HSPA and LTE networks. It also has a loudspeaker and 3.5 mm audio jack.

Galaxy A32 5G uses MediaTek MT6853 Dimensity 720 5G (7 nm) SoC with octa-core CPU (2x2.0 GHz Cortex-A76 + 6x2.0 GHz Cortex-A55) and Mali G57-MC3 GPU. It runs on Android 11 with One UI 3.1. It has 64 GB or 128 GB of internal memory (ROM) with 4-8 GB of RAM. It has removable external microSDXC memory card slot (uses shared SIM slot, maximum 512 GB is supported). It has single or hybrid dual (dual stand-by) SIM slot (nano-SIM). It has 5000 mAh Li-Ion battery (non-removable) with 15W fast charging support. It supports GSM, CDMA, HSPA, LTE and 5G networks. It also has a loudspeaker and 3.5 mm audio jack.

Display

4G variant 
Super AMOLED, 90 Hz refresh rate, 800 nits brightness (HBM), Infinity-U Display
6.4-inches with 98.9 cm2 body to screen, with ~84.6% screen-to-body ratio
1080 × 2400 pixels resolution, 20:9 ratio with ~411 ppi density

5G variant 
PLS TFT, 90 Hz refresh rate, Infinity-U Display
6.5-inches with 102 cm2 body to screen, with ~81.6% screen-to-body ratio.
720 × 1600 pixels resolution, 20:9 ratio with ~270 ppi density.

Camera

4G variant

Rear camera 
Quad camera setup:
64 MP main camera (f/1.8 aperture, 26mm focal length, PDAF)
8 MP wide-angle camera (f/2.2 aperture, 123˚ field of view, 1/4.0" sensor size, 1.12 µm pixel size)
5 MP macro camera (f/2.4 aperture)
5 MP depth sensor (f/2.4 aperture)

Front camera 
20 MP (f/2.2 aperture)

Features 
Single LED flash, panorama, HDR

Video recording 
1080p@30fps
720p@120fps

5G variant

Rear camera 
Quad camera setup:
48 MP main camera (f/1.8 aperture, 26mm focal length, 1/2.0" sensor size, 0.8 µm pixel size, PDAF)
8 MP wide-angle camera (f/2.2 aperture, 123˚ field of view, 1/4.0" sensor size, 1.12 µm pixel size)
5 MP macro camera (f/2.4 aperture)
2 MP depth sensor (f/2.4 aperture)

Front camera 
13 MP  (f/2.2 aperture)

Features 
Single LED flash, panorama, HDR

Video recording 
4K@30fps
1080p@30fps/120fps
1080p@30fps (front)

Sensors

4G variant 
Under-display fingerprint (optical) sensor
Accelerometer
Gyro
Proximity sensor
Compass

5G variant 
Side-mounted fingerprint sensor
Accelerometer
Gyro
Proximity sensor
Compass

Connectivity

4G variant 
WLAN: Wi-Fi 802.11 a/b/g/n/ac, dual-band, Wi-Fi Direct, hotspot
Bluetooth 5.0, A2DP, LE
GPS with A-GPS, GLONASS, GALILEO, BDS
NFC (market/region dependent)
Radio: FM, RDS, recording
USB Type-C 2.0, USB On-The-Go

5G variant 
WLAN: Wi-Fi 802.11 a/b/g/n/ac, dual-band, Wi-Fi Direct, hotspot
Bluetooth 5.0, A2DP, LE
GPS with A-GPS, GLONASS, GALILEO, BDS
NFC (market/region dependent)
Radio: unspecified
USB Type-C 2.0, USB On-The-Go

Reception 
The device was given a positive reception, but the camera, especially the 5G variant, was considered to be mediocre with Wired giving it an 8/10, The Verge giving it a 7.5/10.

References 

Samsung Galaxy
Mobile phones introduced in 2021
Android (operating system) devices
Samsung smartphones
Mobile phones with multiple rear cameras
Mobile phones with 4K video recording